Plagiostropha caledoniensis is a species of sea snail, a marine gastropod mollusk in the family Drilliidae.

Description

Distribution
This marine species occurs in the demersal zone off New Caledonia at depths between 200 m and 350 m.

References

  Tucker, J.K. 2004 Catalog of recent and fossil turrids (Mollusca: Gastropoda). Zootaxa 682:1–1295

External links
 
 Holotype at MNHN, Paris

caledoniensis
Gastropods described in 1995